Jorma Christopher Taccone (born March 19, 1977) is an American comedian, actor, writer, and director. He is one-third of the sketch comedy troupe The Lonely Island, with childhood friends Andy Samberg and Akiva Schaffer. In 2010, Taccone co-wrote and directed the SNL spinoff film MacGruber, which was his directorial debut. He directed his second feature alongside Schaffer, the musical comedy Popstar: Never Stop Never Stopping, which he also co-wrote and co-starred in with Schaffer and Samberg.

Personal life
Taccone was born in Berkeley, California, the son of Suellen Ehnebuske and Tony Taccone, the artistic director of the Berkeley Repertory Theatre. His father is of half Italian and half Puerto Rican descent. He attended University of California, Los Angeles (UCLA) and graduated with a BA in Theater in 2000. His brother, Asa, is a member of the band Electric Guest. He is named after his father's friend, Jorma Kaukonen, Jefferson Airplane's famed guitarist.

Taccone lives in New York City. He is married to film director Marielle Heller, with whom he has a son (born December 12, 2014). His brother-in-law, Nate, a musician, composed the scores for The Diary of a Teenage Girl and Can You Ever Forgive Me?. His sister-in-law, Emily, is a stand-up comic and a writer for the HBO comedy Barry.

Career

In the fall of 2005, Samberg, Taccone, and Schaffer joined the staff of NBC's late-night variety show Saturday Night Live. Since then, as The Lonely Island, they have created more than 100 SNL Digital Shorts including the YouTube favorites "Lazy Sunday" (featuring Chris Parnell), "Jizz in My Pants", "I'm on a Boat" (featuring T-Pain) and the Emmy-winning "Dick in a Box" (featuring Justin Timberlake). Taccone produces much of the music for The Lonely Island, including "Lazy Sunday", "Dick in a Box", and many other tracks that appear on The Lonely Island first album, Incredibad, released in February 2009. As a director, he is responsible for the SNL shorts "MacGruber", "Business Meeting", "Sloths", "Giraffes", and others. He also directed a "MacGruber" Pepsi commercial spot for the 43rd Super Bowl, which aired February 1, 2009.

In 2007, Taccone co-starred in Paramount's Hot Rod (starring Andy Samberg, directed by Akiva Schaffer). He is one of the principal actors in the music video "Jizz in My Pants" too. He played Guy #2 in "We Like Sportz", reprising the role from "Just 2 Guyz", and the lead role of Brett in The Lonely Island's The 'Bu, the group's record-breaking contribution to Channel 101, where he played a ninja who did not belong. The 'Bu, a parody of The OC, also starred Sarah Chalke as Melissa and Andy Samberg as Aaron. In the group's first Channel 101 show, "ITV Buzz Countdown", he played Chris Hoffman, a fictional VJ in a parody of MTV's Total Request Live.

Taccone made a cameo appearance in Role Models as Mitch from Graphics, where he sang a karaoke version of the Scorpions' "Rock You Like a Hurricane"; and co-starred in the Gnarls Barkley music video for the song "Who's Gonna Save My Soul".

Taccone appeared as Cha-Ka in Universal's 2009 film Land of the Lost (starring Will Ferrell), for which he was nominated for the Razzie Award for Worst Supporting Actor. In August 2009, he directed his first film, an adaptation of the Saturday Night Live sketch MacGruber that was featured as part of the group male vocals on Lightspeed Champion's album Life Is Sweet! Nice to Meet You. As of SNLs 36th season, he was no longer cited in the end credits, though he was still listed on the NBC website as a writer and holds the unofficial title of "Sexiest Member of Lonely Island". However, according to the band's website, thelonelyisland.com, "the Dudes" were still responsible for the SNL Digital Shorts. It was later confirmed Taccone had left Saturday Night Live, though he worked on some shorts in the 36th season.

Taccone acted in season 5 of MyDamnChannel's Wainy Days and is the director of the AT&T Wireless television ad campaign It's Not Complicated. He also had a recurring role on the HBO show Girls as the character Booth Jonathan.

In 2015, Taccone appeared in the Kickstarter short movie Kung Fury as Adolf Hitler (A.K.A. Kung-Führer). He will play this role again in the sequel Kung Fury 2.

Filmography

FilmExecutive producer'''
 The Diary of a Teenage Girl (2015)
 It Happened in L.A. (2017)
 The Unauthorized Bash Brothers Experience'' (2019)

Acting roles

Television

Acting roles

Songwriting for media

Videography
 "Just 2 Guyz" (2005)
 "Jizz in My Pants" (2008)
 "Who's Gonna Save My Soul" (2008)
 "We Like Sportz" (2008)
 "I'm on a Boat" (2009)
 "Like a Boss" (2009)
 "I Just Had Sex" (2010)
 "The Creep" (2011)
 "House of Cosbys" (2011)
 "We're Back" (2011)
 "We'll Kill U" (2011)
 "Jack Sparrow" (2011)
 "American Daydream" (2012)
 "YOLO" (2013)
 "Between Two Ferns/Spring Break Anthem" (2013)
 "Diaper Money" (2013)
 "We Need Love" (2013)
 "The Wire" (2013)
 "Hugs" (2013)
 "Go Kindergarten" (2013)

References

External links

The Lonely Island

The Lonely Island members
1977 births
Living people
21st-century American comedians
21st-century American male actors
American comedy musicians
American comedy writers
American male comedians
American male film actors
American male television actors
American male television writers
American people of Dutch descent
American people of German descent
American people of Finnish descent
American people of Italian descent
American people of Puerto Rican descent
American television directors
American television writers
Berkeley High School (Berkeley, California) alumni
Comedy film directors
Male actors from Berkeley, California
Screenwriters from California
UCLA Film School alumni